The Chirality Medal, instituted by the Società Chimica Italiana in 1991 to honor internationally recognized scientists who have made a distinguished contribution to all aspects of chirality, is awarded each year by a Chirality Medal Honor Committee composed of the Chirality International Committee members and the most recent recipients of the Chirality Medal. The medal is awarded to the recipient at the International Conference on Chirality.

List of Past Winners

See also

 List of chemistry awards

References 

Chemistry awards